{{Speciesbox
| image = Neurobasis chinensis-Thattekad-2015-09-13-001.jpg
| image_caption = male
| image2 = Neurobasis chinensis-Aralam-2016-10-29-003.jpg
| image2_caption = female
| status = LC | status_system = IUCN3.1
| status_ref = 
| taxon = Neurobasis chinensis
| authority = (Linnaeus, 1758)
| synonyms=
Agrion nobilitata Calopteryx disparilis 
Calopteryx sinensis 
}}Neurobasis chinensis'', stream glory is a species of damselfly in the family Calopterygidae. It is a common species distributed across much of Asia.

Description and habitat

It is a large metallic bronze-green colored damselfly. Its fore-wings are transparent, tinted in pale yellow with green neuration. Its hind-wings are opaque in brilliant metallic green or peacock-blue according to angle of view. They flash the wings, displaying the colors to attract females. The colour is produced by interference from the thin surfaces of the wing membrane. Female is very similar to the male. But its wings are transparent and light coffee brown with white wings spots. There are another creamy yellow patches at the nodes.

This species breeds in forest streams. The males maintain their territories along stretches of moderately fast-flowing streams. Normally found only near the water bodies. Female lays eggs in submerged vegetation, often among root masses. The naiads burrow in sediment underwater and have a long abdomen that is held recurved above the body.

See also
 List of odonates of India
 List of odonata of Kerala

References

External links

Calopterygidae
Damselflies described in 1758
Taxa named by Carl Linnaeus